Eleventh Mom (also known as My 11th Mother) is a 2007 South Korean film starring Kim Hye-soo, Kim Young-chan and Ryu Seung-ryong. It was released on November 29, 2007, and attracted 350,204 admissions.

Plot
Jae-soo (Kim Young-chan) leads a cruel life for an 11-year-old. His father (Ryu Seung-ryong) is an abusive and jobless gambler, so the little boy has learned to survive on his own, cooking or carefully spending his food stamps and running a string of part-time jobs. His father has previously taken home 10 girlfriends, and Jae-soo is used to the comings and goings of such transient mother figures. But one day, his father shows up with a woman (Kim Hye-soo). This eleventh "stepmother" moves in without warning, and the boy and woman are equally distrustful of each other. Jae-soo regards the woman as another person who'll leave and does not put any effort in getting to know her, while she is a cynical, aging bar girl seemingly devoid of maternal instincts. Jae-soo has dealt with all sorts of women, but this one is the worst by far. The two continually complain about each other and bicker. However, as time passes he learns that she and he have more in common than he realizes, and they eventually develop a close bond.

Cast

 Kim Hye-soo as Woman
 Kim Young-chan as Jae-soo
 Ryu Seung-ryong as Jae-soo's father
 Kim Ji-young as Baek-jung's mother
 Hwang Jung-min as Baek-jung
 Noh Min-woo as Joon-min
 Ahn Daniel as Ban-jang
 Gu Bon-im as Ban-jang's mother 
 Park Hyun-woo as Sung-hyun
 Lee Eung-jae as Kkakdugi ("cubed radish")
 Im Yoon-jung as high school girl
 Kim Dong-hyun as 30-year-old thug
 Hong Ki-joon as photographer 
 Hwang In-jung as teacher in charge
 Maeng Bong-hak as doctor 
 Park Moon-ah as classmate

References

External links
  
 
 
 

2007 films
2000s Korean-language films
Showbox films
South Korean drama films
2007 drama films
2000s South Korean films